The Hualien Cultural and Creative Industries Park is a multi-purpose park in Hualien City, Hualien County, Taiwan.

History
The buildings in the area used to be constructed during the Japanese rule of Taiwan as the brewing site for red wine and rice wine for Yilan Distillery. The land to construct the park was obtained on 2 April 2011. In May 2011, the operation plan was reviews and the first phase of the park was opened in September 2011. On 2 October 2011, the park was 30% opened and trial operation began. The park was fully opened in 2015.

Architecture
The park spans over an area of 3.3 hectares and consists of 26 old factory warehouses.

Transportation
The park is accessible within walking distance south of Hualien Station of Taiwan Railways.

See also
 List of tourist attractions in Taiwan

References

External links

  

2011 establishments in Taiwan
Arts centres in Taiwan
Buildings and structures in Hualien County
Event venues established in 2011
Hualien City